Xerocomorubin is a pigment from the fungus order Boletales. It is the oxidized form of isoxerocomic acid. Air oxidation is responsible its formation, and it oxidizes faster to a similar pulvinic acid type pigment oxidized variant, variegatorubin. The long wavelength has an absorption at 497 nm, 106 nm higher than its precursor isoxerocomic acid. Synthesis experiments have shown tetra-acetylation by acetic anhydride and sulfuric acid. Although xerocomorubin and variegatorubin give off the same deep red color and could simultaneously occur in a mushroom, extracts from the deep red colored mushroom Boletus rubellus Krombh. identified only variegatorubin by thin layer chromatography (TLC), leading to the question the natural abundance of xerocomorubin.

References

Benzofurans
Furanones
Polyphenols
Catechols
3-Hydroxypropenals